Creighton  may refer to:

Places

Canada 
 Creighton, Saskatchewan
 Creighton, Simcoe County, Ontario
 Creighton Mine, a mine in Greater Sudbury, Ontario
 Creighton Mine, Ontario

South Africa 
 Creighton, KwaZulu-Natal

United States 
 Creighton, Florida
 Creighton, Missouri
 Creighton, Nebraska
 Creighton, Pennsylvania
 Creighton, South Dakota
 Creighton Township, Knox County, Nebraska

Education
 Creighton Preparatory School, Omaha, Nebraska
 Creighton University, Omaha, Nebraska
 Fortismere School, north London, England, formed from Creighton School and Alexandra Park School

Other uses
 Creighton (name), a given name and surname
 Creightons, a British manufacturer of consumer goods
 10046 Creighton, a carbonaceous background asteroid 
 Mount Creighton, Antarctica

See also
 Crichton (disambiguation)
 Crighton, a surname